Conioscinella is a genus of fly in the family Chloropidae.

Species list

References

Europe
Nearctic

External links

Oscinellinae
Chloropidae genera